The Glencoe Public School District is located in Glencoe, Oklahoma, United States. The Glencoe school district has two schools.

The district is managed by the Superintendent John Lazenby, who works under the direction of a five-person board. Before becoming the superintendent of Glencoe Public Schools, Lazenby was the superintendent of Cement Public Schools.

The mascot of both the district and the high school is the Panther.

Schools

High school
 Glencoe High School (Grades 9-12)

Elementary school
 7th and 8th grade are considered part of the elementary school.
 Glencoe Elementary School (Grades PK-8)

References

External links
 

School districts in Oklahoma
Education in Payne County, Oklahoma